Richard Michael Locke (born April 22, 1959) is an American political scientist who is currently provost of Brown University, a position he has held since July 2015. Locke became Brown's fourth Provost in six years, after his predecessor, Vicki Colvin, announced her resignation after less than one year in the position. A scholar on labor rights and corporate social responsibility, he previously served as the Howard R. Swearer Director of the Watson Institute for International and Public Affairs at Brown, and the deputy dean of MIT's Sloan School of Management.

Biography 

The second of four children of Franca Franzaroli, Locke is a 1981 graduate of Wesleyan University and holds a PhD in political science from the Massachusetts Institute of Technology, as well as a master's degree in education from the University of Chicago. He began his academic career at MIT as an Assistant Professor of International Management, before becoming the Alvin J. Siteman Chair in Entrepreneurship, and later the Class of 1922 Professor of Political Science and Management. He also served as chair of MIT's Political Science Department and deputy dean in the MIT Sloan School of Management. 

Locke was named the Schreiber Family Professor of Political Science and International and Public Affairs at Brown University in January 2018.

Locke currently serves as a member of the Council on Foreign Relations, and the International Labour Organization (ILO) and the International Finance Corporation (IFC) Better Work Program Advisory Committee. He has also served as chair of  the Academic Advisory Board at Apple Inc.

For his ongoing research on fair and safe working conditions in global supply chains, Locke was awarded with an inaugural Progress Medal for Scholarship and Leadership on Fairness and Well-being by the Society for Progress in 2016.

In 2014, Locke married Zairo Cheibub.

Selected publications 
 "Remaking the Italian Economy". Cornell University Press. 1995.
 "Production in the Innovation Economy". MIT Press. 2014.
 "The Promise and Limits of Private Power". Cambridge University Press. 2013.
 "Does Monitoring Improve Labor Standards? Lessons from Nike". IRL Review. 2007.
 "Working in America". MIT Press. 2001.
 "Employment Relations in a Changing World Economy". MIT Press. 1995.

References 

1959 births
Living people
MIT Sloan School of Management faculty
Brown University faculty
Wesleyan University alumni
Massachusetts Institute of Technology alumni
University of Chicago alumni
MIT School of Humanities, Arts, and Social Sciences faculty